A billy goat is a male goat.

Billy goat may also refer to:

Billy Goat (band), American band
William Windsor (goat), a goat also known as Billy the Goat
Billy Goat, a character in the Donald Duck universe
The Billy Goat Tavern, a chain of taverns mostly in the Chicago area.
Sergeant Bill, a Canadian WW1 military mascot

See also
Curse of the Billy Goat, a sports-related curse supposedly placed on the Chicago Cubs Major League Baseball franchise